Membrane optics is a flat lens that employs plastic in place of glass to diffract rather than reflect or refract light. Concentric microscopic grooves etched into the plastic provide the diffraction.

Glass transmits light with 90% efficiency, while membrane efficiencies range from 30-55%. Membrane thickness is on the order of that of plastic wrap.

Applications

MOIRE program 
DARPA plans to use membrane optics as part of its Membrane Optical Imager for Real-Time Exploitation (MOIRE) program. Membrane grooves range from 4 to hundreds of micrometers in width.

According to DARPA, glass-based optics in satellites are reaching the point where larger mirrors exceed the lifting power of existing rockets. The MOIRE devices is planned to be one-seventh the weight of a comparable glass-mirrored device.

Individual membranes would be mounted on foldable metal petals. Once in geostationary orbit, the satellite would unfold. The membrane lens occupies one end and a sensor suite the other.

The device would be the largest telescope ever built – twice the size of the ground-based twin  Keck telescopes. It could see about 40 percent of the Earth's surface and could image a  area at a  resolution and generate videos at one frame per second.

See also
Zone plate

References

External links 
 
 
 Nautilus Space Telescope

Telescope types